Marcos da Silva França (born 10 September 1989), commonly known as Keno, is a Brazilian footballer who plays as a forward for Fluminense.

Club career

Early career
Born in Salvador, Bahia, Keno started his career at América-SE in 2009. In 2012, he moved to hometown club Botafogo de Salvador, achieving promotion to Campeonato Baiano in his first year.

In May 2013, Keno joined Série C club Águia de Marabá, and scored seven goals during the tournament. Highlights included a brace in a 4–0 home routing of Luverdense on 11 August.

Paraná
On 4 December 2013, Keno was released by Águia as the club was immerse in a financial crisis. Twelve days later, he was announced at Paraná.

Keno made his debut for the club on 26 January 2014, coming on as a second-half substitute in a 0–2 Campeonato Paranaense away loss against rivals Coritiba. His first goal came on 5 March, the second in a 2–1 win at Toledo Colônia Work.

Keno made his professional debut on 2 May 2014, starting in a 1–1 away draw against Santa Cruz for the Série B championship. He appeared in three further matches for the club, all as a starter, before leaving due to unpaid wages.

Santa Cruz
On 14 June 2014, Keno signed for fellow second division club Santa Cruz, until the end of the year. He made his debut for the club 15 July, playing 21 minutes in a 1–4 away loss against Vasco da Gama.

Keno scored his first professional goal on 9 August 2014, netting the first in a 3–0 home success over fierce rivals Náutico. He finished the campaign with three goals in 25 appearances for Santinha, as his side finished ninth.

Atlas
On 16 December 2014, Keno agreed to a transfer to Liga MX side Club Atlas. He made his debut for the club the following 18 January, starting in a 2–1 home win against Monarcas Morelia.

Keno made his Copa Libertadores debut on 18 February 2015, playing the full 90 minutes in a 0–1 home loss against Independiente Santa Fe. He left the club with 14 appearances, but with no goals.

Ponte Preta
On 22 June 2015 Keno returned to his home country, signing for Ponte Preta. He made his debut for the club – and in the Série A – on 11 July, replacing Felipe Azevedo in a 0–2 home loss against Atlético Mineiro.

Keno made 12 league appearances for Ponte during his spell, all from the bench. His only goal for the club came on 22 July 2015, in a 2–1 Copa do Brasil home win against Coritiba; he was also sent off during the match.

Santa Cruz return
On 30 December 2015, Keno returned to his former club Santa Cruz. He made his second debut for the club the following 11 February in a 4–2 home win against América-PE, replacing Wallyson and receiving a straight red card after only three minutes on the field.

Keno helped the club to achieve both Campeonato Pernambucano and Copa do Nordeste titles during the season, netting five goals in the latter competition. He scored his first goal in the main category of Brazilian football on 15 May 2016, netting the last in a 4–1 home routing of Vitória; it was also Santa's first game in the top tier after nearly ten years.

On 18 September 2016, Keno scored a brace in a 2–3 away loss against Santos. The following weekend, he added another in a 1–3 loss at Figueirense, taking his tally up to eight goals.

Palmeiras
At the end of 2016 Palmeiras announced the signing of Keno, confirming that he will join the club in January 2017. In 40 appearances he scored 9 goals. He was often called a pass and goal machine.

Pyramids F.C.
On 25 June 2018, it was announced that Keno had agreed to transfer to Egyptian side Pyramids for a fee US$10 million. Keno became the most expensive transfer of Egyptian football, and one of the few Brazilians playing in Pyramids

Al Jazira Club
On 7 July 2019, Al-Jazira has signed  Keno on a one-season loan.

Atlético Mineiro
On 18 June 2020, Atlético Mineiro announced the signing of Keno on a three-year contract, with the option of a one-year extension.

Fluminense
On 21 December 2022, Keno joined Fluminense on a two-year deal with an optional one-year extension.

Career statistics

Honours
Santa Cruz
Copa do Nordeste: 2016
Campeonato Pernambucano: 2016

Atlético Mineiro
Campeonato Brasileiro Série A: 2021
Copa do Brasil: 2021
Campeonato Mineiro: 2020, 2021, 2022
Supercopa do Brasil: 2022

References

External links
 
 
 

1989 births
Living people
Sportspeople from Salvador, Bahia
Brazilian footballers
Association football forwards
Campeonato Brasileiro Série A players
Campeonato Brasileiro Série B players
Campeonato Brasileiro Série C players
Águia de Marabá Futebol Clube players
UAE Pro League players
Paraná Clube players
Santa Cruz Futebol Clube players
Associação Atlética Ponte Preta players
Sociedade Esportiva Palmeiras players
Pyramids FC players
Al Jazira Club players
Clube Atlético Mineiro players
Fluminense FC players
Liga MX players
Atlas F.C. footballers
Brazilian expatriate footballers
Brazilian expatriate sportspeople in Mexico
Expatriate footballers in Mexico
Brazilian expatriate sportspeople in Egypt
Expatriate footballers in Egypt
Brazilian expatriate sportspeople in the United Arab Emirates
Expatriate footballers in the United Arab Emirates